Gene Grabeel (June 5, 1920 – January 30, 2015) was an American mathematician and cryptanalyst who founded the Venona project.

Early life 
Grabeel was born on June 5, 1920, in Rose Hill, Lee County, Virginia, where she grew up; her mother raised chickens and her father farmed tobacco. She graduated from Mars Hill College and Farmville State Teachers College and initially worked as a high school home economics teacher in Madison Heights to teenage girls.

Career 
On the recommendation of a friend of hers, Frank Rowlett, Grabeel joined the Signal Intelligence Service on December 28, 1942, where she was assigned to attack intercepted Soviet ciphertext. Her father gave her his permission to do so and "push some papers around" during the next few months. Thusly did Grabeel began her 36-year career with the Signal Intelligence Service.

On February 1, 1943, she founded the Venona project, a counterintelligence program aimed at decrypting Soviet communications. She and others spent months sifting through stored and incoming Soviet telegrams. Grabeel initially worked with Leonard Zubko, a Russian speaker, but he was soon replaced.

In his book Code Warriors: NSA's Codebreakers and the Secret Intelligence War Against the Soviet Union, Stephen Budiansky describes how she came into the opportunity to work as a U.S. government cryptanalyst:
Grabeel retired from service in 1978, as the Venona project came to a close.

Personal life 
Grabeel attended Blackstone Baptist Church.
She was a member of the Daughters of the American Revolution and of the 17th Century Colonial Dames. Later in life, she was a fan of University of Virginia basketball. She dated men, but was not interested in marriage, similarly to her colleagues.

Death and legacy 
Grabeel died at age 94 on January 30, 2015, in Blackstone, Virginia.
 After the 1995 declassification of the Venona project, Grabeel was recognized by the Central Intelligence Agency as an "American Hero".
 She was memorialized with a historical highway marker along with Frank Rowlett in Virginia.

References

External links 
 The Venona Story

1920 births
2015 deaths
20th-century American mathematicians
Signals Intelligence Service cryptographers
Female Signal Intelligence Service personnel in World War II
American women mathematicians
20th-century American women scientists
People from Rose Hill, Virginia
People from Blackstone, Virginia
20th-century women mathematicians
Mathematicians from Virginia
21st-century American women